Hovyiat (correct English transliteration: "hoviyyat" , "Identity") is a biweekly TV program that was produced and aired on Iran's IRIB TV1 in 1996. The program's objective was said to be "confrontation with western cultural invasion." The series targeted a broad range of Iranian intellectuals (secular as well as religious modernists), archeologists, artists, scientists and national leaders as Mohammad Mosaddeq.

It has been described by critics as part of an "ideological campaign" by the Ministry of Intelligence "to paint Westernized [Iranian] intellectuals and artists as unpatriotic, un-Islamic, a threat to Iran's national and religious identity,"  and which included the "chain murders" of Iranian intellectuals that also occurred during the 1990s.

The show is said to have "specialized in naming intellectuals as `hired agents` of the Baháʼís, Zionists, Freemasons," and foreign powers.  A signature of the program was the morphing of an image of American Benjamin Franklin on the American hundred-dollar bill, "into the face of the Iranian intellectual under attack."

One Iranian dissident, Faraj Sarkohi, was kidnapped by security officials after (amongst other things) publishing an article "critical" of `Hoviyyat.` He was "tortured to `make and remake` videotapes confessing to being a `foreign spy` and giving outrageous lies about his own and his colleagues' sex lives," before being released.

Responsibles
Ali Larijani
Hossein Shariatmadari
Saeed Emami
Nasser Pourpirar

Targets of the propaganda
Mohammad Mosaddeq
Ahmad Tafazzoli
Abdolhossein Zarrinkoub
Ezzatollah Sahabi
Ali Akbar Saidi Sirjani
Nasrollah Pourjavadi

See also

Chain Murders of Iran

References 

History of the Islamic Republic of Iran
Iranian neoconservatism
Iranian television shows
Propaganda television broadcasts
1990s Iranian television series 
1996 Iranian television series debuts
Islamic Republic of Iran Broadcasting original programming
Persian-language television shows